Lens Creek is a tributary of the Kanawha River,  long, in West Virginia in the United States.

Lens Creek flows for its entire length in Kanawha County. It flows into the Kanawha River in the city of Marmet. The creek is paralleled for most of its course by West Virginia Route 94.

The creek was named after Leonard "Len" Morris, a pioneer settler.

See also
List of rivers of West Virginia

References 

Rivers of West Virginia
Rivers of Kanawha County, West Virginia
Tributaries of the Kanawha River